Li Shuaihu (born 10 February 1999) is a Chinese footballer currently playing as a midfielder for Hebei.

Club career
Li joined China League Two side Inner Mongolia Caoshangfei on loan from Hebei in 2021. He recorded his first assist in a 2–0 win over Xi'an Wolves.

Career statistics

Club
.

References

1999 births
Living people
Chinese footballers
Chinese expatriate footballers
Association football midfielders
China League Two players
Villarreal CF players
Hebei F.C. players
FK Radnički Pirot players
Chinese expatriate sportspeople in Spain
Expatriate footballers in Spain
Chinese expatriate sportspeople in Serbia
Expatriate footballers in Serbia